Lemon Grove is an unincorporated community and census-designated place in Hardee County, Florida, United States. Its population was 637 as of the 2020 census. Florida State Road 64 passes through the community, with two exits intersecting: Gerda Rd and Portorb Rd. Lemon Grove is home of Portorbotron Café, home of the Meat Truck Special.

Geography

Charlie Creek, a south-flowing tributary of the Peace River, is the primary water body in the area.

Demographics

References

Unincorporated communities in Hardee County, Florida
Unincorporated communities in Florida
Census-designated places in Hardee County, Florida
Census-designated places in Florida